Sarv Mittra Sikri (26 April 1908 – 24 September 1992) was an Indian advocate and judge who served as the 13th Chief Justice of India, from 22 January 1971 until his retirement on 25 April 1973. He previously served as the first Advocate General of Punjab before becoming the first of nine Judges of the Supreme Court of India to have been appointed directly from the Bar, and also the first of only two to be CJI, directly from the Bar.

Biography
Sikri was born in Lahore on 26 April 1908. He moved to London to study medicine, bust switched to law, studying at Trinity College, Cambridge. Before returning to Lahore in 1930, he served as a barrister-at-law at Lincoln's Inn, in London.

He began his legal practise in the chambers of Jagannath Agarwal, who was a leading advocate in the Lahore High Court and practiced criminal and civil law. Following independence, he was appointed the Assistant Advocate General of Punjab in 1949 and soon as the advocate general in 1951. Held the same position almost entirely until his elevation as a judge of the Supreme Court of India in 1964.

As an advocate, he appeared and practised in various courts, ranging from the Lahore High Court and other courts in Punjab to the Federal Court of India and eventually the Supreme Court of India.

Notable judgements
I.C. Golaknath and Ors. vs State of Punjab and Anrs. had him a part of the thin majority of 6:5, in which the court reversed its earlier decision which had upheld Parliament's power to amend all parts of the Constitution, including Part III related to Fundamental Rights. The judgement left Parliament with no power to curtail Fundamental Rights.

References

Chief justices of India
1908 births
1992 deaths
20th-century Indian lawyers
20th-century Indian judges